Go2Sky is a Slovak ACMI specialist and charter airline headquartered in Bratislava and based at Bratislava Airport.

History 
Go2Sky was founded on 14 February 2013. The Slovak airline offered its aircraft for non-scheduled charter operations of passengers, cargo and mail. Furthermore, the airline offered lease ACMI (wet-lease) of their aircraft, designed for other airlines (AOC holder) and ad hoc charter flights. Go2Sky is IOSA (IATA Operational Safety Audit) certified since 2015.

For the summer season 2014, the airline had signed a wet-lease contract with the Italian charter airline Mistral Air for two aircraft and Hamburg Airways for one airframe. In 2015 Go2Sky leased aircraft to Mistral Air, Ukraine International, Norwegian Air Shuttle, Royal Air Maroc and Arkia. In 2016 to Czech Airlines, Mistral Air, Travel Service (airline), AlbaStar and Norwegian Air Shuttle. They also operated flights for Adria Airways with their B737-800 aircraft. Go2Sky secured Spring/Summer season 2019 wet-lease contracts for two B737-800s to Enter Air of Poland and one B737-800 to Corendon Airlines of Turkey.

On 19 August 2020, despite profits over the last two years, it was announced that Go2Sky would cease operations on 1 September 2020, due to the COVID-19 pandemic, whilst continuing to hold their AOC. However later that year it was decided that the airline would resume operations the following year and Go2Sky resumed operations in August 2021, operating for Corendon Airlines between Germany and various holiday destinations.

Fleet 

The Go2Sky fleet consisted of the following aircraft:

Incidents and accidents 
A Go2Sky Boeing 737-800 operated on behalf of Norwegian Air Shuttle, registration LN-NII performing flight DY-277 from Kristiansand to Oslo (Norway), entered Kristiansand's runway 04, began to accelerate for takeoff, the crew rejected takeoff at low speed and stopped the aircraft after about 230 meters due to a takeoff configuration warning. The crew mistakenly shut down both engines, which caused all electrics to shut down as well including cabin lighting. The aircraft remained in position for about 5 minutes and at this time the cabin crew walked the aisles to calm passengers. The flight attendants from Norwegian Air Shuttle expected another call by the cockpit crew to take their seats prior to takeoff, however, suddenly the engines accelerated for takeoff and the aircraft departed with the cabin crew rushing to their seats. The aircraft stopped the climb at FL150 (usual cruise level FL260) the crew received a cabin altitude warning and levelled off at low altitude, it was later found the air conditioning systems had not been activated.

References

External links 

  

Airlines of Slovakia
Airlines established in 2013
Slovakian companies established in 2013